Gérald Rigolet (born March 26, 1941 in Switzerland) is a former Swiss ice hockey player who played for the Switzerland men's national ice hockey team at the 1964 and 1972 Olympics.

External links
Gerard Rigolet statistics at Sports-Reference.com

1941 births
HC La Chaux-de-Fonds players
Swiss ice hockey goaltenders
Olympic ice hockey players of Switzerland
Living people
Ice hockey players at the 1964 Winter Olympics
Ice hockey players at the 1972 Winter Olympics
Sportspeople from the canton of Fribourg